The 2007 Trail Appliances Autumn Gold Curling Classic was the 30th annual edition of the event. It marked the first Grand Slam event of the Women's World Curling Tour. It was held October 5-9 at the Calgary Curling Club in Calgary, Alberta. The total purse for the event was $56,000 with $14,000 going to the winning team of Jennifer Jones, Cathy Overton-Clapham, Jill Officer and Dawn Askin. They beat Shannon Kleibrink's rink in the final.

Participating teams (skips)
 Sherry Anderson 
 Glenys Bakker 
 Cheryl Bernard
 Renelle Bryden 
 Diane Foster 
 Brittany Gregor 
 Jenn Hanna 
 Amber Holland 
 Colleen Jones 
 Jennifer Jones 
 Andrea Kelly
 Cathy King 
 Shannon Kleibrink 
 Stefanie Lawton 
 Terry Loschuk 
 Colleen Madonia 
 Jolene McIvor 
 Moe Meguro 
 Sherry Middaugh 
 Kristie Moore 
 Mirjam Ott 
 Ludmila Privivkova 
 Heather Rankin 
 Julie Reddick 
 Darcy Robertson 
 Deb Santos 
 Kelly Scott
 Rhonda Skillen 
 Renée Sonnenberg 
 Shauna Streich 
 Wang Bingyu 
 Crystal Webster

Playoffs

Autumn Gold Curling Classic
2007 in Canadian curling
Trail Appliances
2007 in women's curling